Metadiaptomus is a genus of crustacean in the family Diaptomidae, containing the following species:
Metadiaptomus aethiopicus (Daday, 1910)
Metadiaptomus alluaudi (Guerne & Richard, 1890)
Metadiaptomus asiaticus (Ulyanin, 1875)
Metadiaptomus capensis (G. O. Sars, 1907)
Metadiaptomus chevreuxi (Guerne & Richard, 1895)
Metadiaptomus colonialis (Douwe, 1914)
Metadiaptomus gauthieri Brehm, 1949
Metadiaptomus lobulifer (Rylov, 1927)
Metadiaptomus mauretanicus Kiefer & Roy, 1942
Metadiaptomus meridianus (Douwe, 1912)
Metadiaptomus purcelli (G. O. Sars, 1907)
Metadiaptomus transvaalensis Methuen, 1910
Metadiaptomus vandouwei (Kiefer, 1930)

References

Diaptomidae
Taxonomy articles created by Polbot